A pocket Constitution is a printed copy of the United States Constitution that is pocket-sized or pamphlet-sized and can fit in a pocket, purse, or other small container for portability.

Publishers and use
Although the text of the Constitution is easily accessible for free online (including a printable version via the National Archives and Records Administration), the New York Times notes that "pocket-size versions come with an added feature — a physical representation of Americans' rights that can be hoisted during a congressional hearing, political rally or a spirited discussion with a police officer." Although sometimes identified with the right-wing Tea Party movement, pocket Constitutions have been used by figures and advocacy groups on both the left and right for many years.

Former ACLU president Susan Herman says that the first instance she can recall of a prominent politician using a pocket Constitutions for effect came during the Watergate hearings, when the chair of the Senate Watergate Committee, Senator Sam Ervin of North Carolina, pulled out his pocket Constitution, making a "powerful visual impact."

A variety of entities publish and distribute (either through sales or via free giveaways) pocket Constitutions. These include the U.S. Government Publishing Office (GPO), which as of 2016 sells copies for $1.50;  the American Civil Liberties Union (which publishes them en masse and usually sells copies for $5, but offered them for free after Khizr Khan displayed one in an emotional speech at the 2016 Democratic National Convention); the American Constitution Society for Law and Policy; the Heritage Foundation, Hillsdale College (which currently gives them away for free to anyone who requests one), and the Cato Institute, which has given copies away for free to members of Congress and others. Cato began publishing its pocket Constitution in 1998, and by 2005 had distributed more than four million copies. The group also publishes a bilingual Spanish-English edition. The National Center for Constitutional Studies also publishes a copy, which has been criticized for its "ultraconservative annotations and commentary."

Carriers
Paul Broun, U.S. Representative from Georgia (Republican), carries a GPO-printed copy
Stephen G. Breyer, justice of the U.S. Supreme Court
Robert C. Byrd, U.S. Senator from West Virginia (Democratic), the longest-serving U.S. Senator, who famously carried a copy at all times.
Nancy Grace, CNN personality
Dennis Kucinich, U.S. Representative from Ohio (Democratic), began carrying a copy when elected to Congress 
Peter Jennings, anchor of ABC News' World News Tonight, always carried a copy, used the Cato edition
Mike Lee, U.S. Senator from Utah, Lee "has been photographed gesturing with his portable Constitution" and he rotates between copies printed by the Joint Committee on Printing, copies printed by the Bicentennial Commission on the Constitution, and copies printed by the Cato Institute 
William Van Alstyne, constitutional scholar, professor of the William & Mary Marshall-Wythe School of Law 
Ammon Bundy, LaVoy Finicum, and other militants who occupied the Malheur National Wildlife Refuge in 2016 carried pocket constitutions published by the National Center for Constitutional Studies which contain the personal opinions of W. Cleon Skousen, described by the LA Times as an "anti-communist conspiracy theorist".
U.S. Senators Carl Levin of Michigan (Democrat) and Trent Lott of Mississippi (Republican) have both used their pocket Constitutions at public appearances.
Gold Star father Khizr Khan displayed a pocket Constitution during a speech at the 2016 Democratic National Convention directed at Republican presidential nominee Donald Trump, asking "have you even read the United States Constitution? I will gladly lend you my copy."
Brett Kavanaugh,  Associate Justice of the Supreme Court of the United States.

References

Constitution of the United States